"Hass mich" is a song by German boy band Overground. Written by Steve van Velvet, it was released on October 7, 2005 as a single, marking the band's first and only release with Velvet M-Pire Records following their departure from Cheyenne Records. While not as successful as previous singles, the ballad reached number 35 on the German Singles Chart.

Formats and track listings

Charts

References

2005 songs
Overground (band) songs
Edel AG singles